Jimmy P. Anderson (born August 26, 1986) is an American politician.

From Fitchburg, Wisconsin, Anderson received his J.D. degree from University of Wisconsin Law School. A Democrat, he has served in the Wisconsin State Assembly since 2017. In 2010 Anderson was paralyzed from the chest down in California when a drunken driver ran into his car, killing his parents and younger brother.

Notes

1986 births
Living people
People from El Paso, Texas
People from Fitchburg, Wisconsin
University of Wisconsin Law School alumni
American politicians with disabilities
People with paraplegia
21st-century American politicians
Democratic Party members of the Wisconsin State Assembly